Olmesartan/amlodipine/hydrochlorothiazide, sold under the brand name Tribenzor among others, is a fixed-dose combination medication used to treat high blood pressure. It contains olmesartan medoxomil, an angiotensin II receptor blocker, amlodipine, as the besilate, a calcium channel blocker, and hydrochlorothiazide, a thiazide diuretic. It is taken by mouth.

References

External links 
 

Angiotensin II receptor antagonists
Antihypertensive agents
Combination drugs